The 2007 ARAG World Team Cup was a tennis tournament play on outdoor clay courts. It was the 29th edition of the World Team Cup, and was part of the 250 series of the 2007 ATP Tour. It took place at the Rochusclub in Düsseldorf, Germany, from 20 May through 26 May 2007.

Croatia were the defending champions but they didn't participate in this edition.
Argentina defeated Czech Republic in the final, by two rubbers to one for their third title.

Blue group

Standings

Germany vs. Belgium

Czech Republic vs. Spain

Germany vs. Spain

Belgium vs. Czech Republic

Germany vs. Czech Republic

Belgium vs. Spain

Red group

Standings

Argentina vs. Sweden

United States vs. Chile

United States vs. Argentina

Chile vs. Sweden

Sweden vs. United States

Argentina vs. Chile

Final

Argentina vs. Czech Republic

References

World Team Cup
World Team Cup
2007 in German tennis